Edson Warner  (6 March 1930 – 20 August 2019) was a Canadian sports shooter. He competed at the 1952 Summer Olympics in Helsinki and 1960 Summer Olympics in Rome.  He represented Canada at the World Shooting Championships in Oslo (1952), Moscow (1958) and Wiesbaden, West Germany (1966). He earned a place on nine Bisley teams, and competed in matches or friendlies including Commonwealth Games in 13 countries.

Biography
At the 1960 Summer Olympics, Warner led Group Two of 50m prone rifle in qualifying with 394 out of 400, or an average of 98.5 points per target.  On the second day, 99 on his first target was second only to the eventual gold medalist's 100.  However, 93 on his second target and 95 on his fifth target dropped him from credible challenger to 27th place, even though his score of 578 was only 9 points behind the bronze medalist's score.  Such was the level of competitiveness in that event.  Fellow Canadian and defending 1956 Summer Olympics bronze medalist Gil Boa finished 12th with 584.

While serving as an officer in the Militia in the Canadian Army, in the Sherbrooke Regiment, 7th/11th Hussars, and the Sherbrooke Hussars, he won five Queen's Medal for Champion Shot in the Canadian Armed Forces (1955, '68, '69, '70 and '71).  The Queen's Medal is the only Canadian honour awarded in open competition.  He received the Canadian Forces Decoration for long service, and the Queen Elizabeth Diamond Jubilee Medal for a lifetime of high level competitiveness, good sportsmanship and contribution to the military and civilian shooting sports. The Major Edson Warner CD QM5 Trophy was initially awarded to the top individual in Service Rifle, Stage 1 - CAF Reserve., and has since been moved to the winners of Match 32, team casualty evacuation at the Canadian Forces Small Arms Concentration.

He was a member of the Dominion of Canada Rifle Association's Target Rifle Hall of Fame, inducted in 2001 as the 51st member, and the 4th member in the inaugural induction to the Service Conditions Hall of Fame in 2011, was presented his 60-year badge in 2008 following a 60-year tradition of attendance at the National Matches.  In 2012, he was named to the Canadian Forces Sports Hall of Fame.

References

External links
 

1930 births
2019 deaths
Canadian male sport shooters
Olympic shooters of Canada
Shooters at the 1952 Summer Olympics
Shooters at the 1960 Summer Olympics
Sportspeople from Quebec
7th/11th Hussars
7th/11th Hussars officers
Sherbrooke Hussars
Sherbrooke Hussars officers